Paul E. Olsen (born August 4, 1953) is an American paleontologist and author and co-author of a large number of technical papers. Growing up as a teenager in Livingston, New Jersey, he was instrumental in Riker Hill Fossil Site being named a National Natural Landmark as a teenager by sending President Richard Nixon a dinosaur footprint cast from the site. He received a M. Phil. and a Ph.D. in Biology at Yale University in 1984.  His thesis was on the Newark Supergroup.

His interests and research examine patterns of ecosystem evolution and extinction as a response to climate change over geological time, and Triassic and Jurassic Continental Ecosystems. His research methods include paleoclimatology, structural geology, paleontology, palynology, geochemistry, and geophysics.

Professor Olsen is currently Arthur D. Storke Memorial Professor of Earth and Environmental Sciences, Department of Earth and Environmental Sciences, Lamont–Doherty Earth Observatory at Columbia University; Research Associate at the Carnegie Museum of Natural History, Pittsburgh, the American Museum of Natural History and the Virginia Natural History Museum, from which he received the Thomas Jefferson Medal for Outstanding Contributions to Natural Science, in 2015. He was elected to the National Academy of Sciences in 2008.

Recent publications
 Olsen, P.E., Laskar, J., Kent, D.V., Kinney, S.T., Reynolds, D.J., Sha, J., Whiteside, J.H., 2019, Mapping Solar System chaos with the Geological Orrery. PNAS, May 28, 2019 116 (22) 10664-10673.
Peter LeTourneau and Paul Olsen (ed.), (2003) The Great Rift Valleys of Pangea in Eastern North America, vol. 1-2, published by Columbia University Press. Volume 1: Tectonics, Structure, and Volcanism, Volume 2: Sedimentology, Stratigraphy, and Paleontology

In production
 Olsen, Paul E., Dinosaur and Other Fossil Tracks of Eastern North America: Columbia University Press

References

External links
 Columbia homepage
 Curriculum Vitae of Paul E. Olsen
 Lamont–Doherty Earth Observatory

American paleontologists
Science teachers
American science writers
Yale University alumni
Columbia University faculty
1953 births
Living people
People associated with the American Museum of Natural History
People from Livingston, New Jersey